Halswell Quarry operated between 1861 and 1990 before becoming the  Halswell Quarry Park, one of many Christchurch City Council reserves. It offers a combination of walking and mountain biking tracks, historic sites, picnic areas, botanical collections, and six sister city gardens.

Location 

Halswell Quarry Park is located in the suburb of Kennedys Bush at 185 Kennedy's Bush Road in Christchurch, New Zealand.

History of Halswell Quarry 

Halswell Quarry provided crushed stone for roading and cut stone for significant works including the Canterbury Provincial Council Buildings, Durham Street Methodist Church, Cranmer Court formerly Christchurch Normal School and the Sign of the Takahe. The stone was a distinctive blue-grey colour. Between 1861 and 1925 the quarry had several owners and was finally bought, in 1925 by the Christchurch City Council who managed it until 1990 when it became commercially unviable due to reduced stone reserves. It is thought to have been the oldest and longest continually operating quarry in Australasia.

Halswell Quarry buildings 

Three original buildings are still located in Halswell Quarry Park which are the crusher plant workshop (1912), the singlemen's accommodation barracks (1922), and the manager's residence which is listed in Heritage New Zealand as Halswell Quarry stone house and garden (1927). All three buildings were renovated after the 2011 Christchurch earthquake.

Halswell Quarry walks and tracks 

 Canterbury Wetland walk
 Cashmere Hill loop
 Cashmere Road shared use track
 Findlay's walk
 Kennedy's Bush access track
 Quarry Rim track
 Quarry view
 Sister city walks

References

Parks in Christchurch
Quarries